José Manuel Restrepo Abondano (born 1969) is a Colombian academic, economist, journalist and politician who served as the Minister of Finance and Public Credit from 3 May 2021 to 7 August 2022, he also served as Minister of Commerce, Industry and Tourism of Colombia since 7 August 2018 until 3 May 2021.

Education 
José Manuel Restrepo Abondano was born in 1969 and grew up in Bogotá, Colombia.  He attended the all boys Campestre Gymnasium school, an all-male conservative school in the Orquideas district of Bogotá. He graduated from the Del Rosario University in 1994 and completed a master's degree in Economics from the London School of Economics in 1998. He completed a Postgraduate Degree in Finance and Executive Management from the Rosario University in 2004 and 
a PhD in Higher Education Management from the University of Bath in 2015.

Professional career 
Restrepo started his career working as an advisor to the Economic Commission (committee) of the Congress of the Republic of Colombia.  He continued his career in the civil service, becoming Budget and Financial Planning Director of Fonade, the National Fund for Development Projects in Colombia. From 2009–2014, Restrepo was the rector of Colegio de Estudios Superiores de Administración (CESA). He also served as the rector of the Business Foundation of the Chamber of Commerce of Bogotá. On 22nSeptember 2014, he was elected rector of his alma mater Del Rosario University. For ten years he wrote a weekly column for the Bogotá-based newspaper El Nuevo Siglo and in 2013 became a weekly columnist for Colombia's oldest newspaper El Espectador. His last column was published on 21 July, one week after the announcement of his ministerial appointment.

Political career 
In an interview in May 2018 Restrepo talked about becoming politically engaged at university stating that, along with a group of fellow students, he launched a civic movement called "Political Civic Movement, New People". The students stood for local elections in seven districts of Bogotá, three successfully being elected. He was one of the successful students, being elected to the district council of Chapinero, the second district of Bogotá. On 14 July 2018, President-elect Duque announced on Twitter that he had appointed Restrepo to his government as Minister of Commerce, Industry and Tourism. President Duque described Restrepo as "one of the most illustrious Colombians of our generation" and "who will make history in office". Restrepo formally took office on 7 August 2018 following President Duque's inauguration.

References

External links 
 Minister of Commerce, Industry and Tourism of Colombia

|-

|-

1969 births
Living people
Alumni of the London School of Economics
Del Rosario University alumni
Government ministers of Colombia
Ministers of Finance and Public Credit of Colombia
Ministers of Commerce, Industry and Tourism of Colombia
Alumni of the University of Bath
Academic staff of Del Rosario University
20th-century Colombian economists
Colombian journalists
Male journalists
Colombian politicians
21st-century Colombian economists